Anita Östlund (born 30 January 2001) is a Swedish figure skater. She is the 2017 Nordic bronze medalist, 2017 Sofia Trophy silver medalist, and a two-time Swedish national champion (2017, 2019). She represented Sweden at the 2018 Winter Olympics and has competed in the final segment at three ISU Championships.

Personal life
Anita Östlund was born on 30 January 2001 in Odessa, Ukraine. She is the daughter of Yulia, an ethnic Russian, and Peter Östlund. She has three younger sisters – Nicole, Melina, and Michelle.

Career

Early years 
Östlund started learning to skate in 2006. For two seasons beginning in 2012–2013, she competed internationally on the advanced novice level. She won gold at the 2013 Ice Challenge, silver at the 2014 Nordics, and silver at the 2014 Bavarian Open.

2014–2015 season: Junior debut 
Östlund made her ISU Junior Grand Prix (JGP) debut in the 2014–2015 season, placing 17th in Courchevel and 14th in Ostrava. She won the junior ladies' silver medal at the Swedish Championships and was sent to the 2015 World Junior Championships, but did not advance to the free skate after placing 32nd in the short program.

2015–2016 season
Östlund placed 9th at her 2015 JGP assignment in Linz, Austria, and 5th in junior ladies at the 2015 Tallinn Trophy. She won the junior silver medal at the Swedish Championships.

2016–2017 season: Senior debut
Östlund began her season on the JGP series, placing 12th in Yokohama, Japan, and 7th in Tallinn, Estonia. Making her senior international debut, she placed 7th at the Warsaw Cup, a Challenger Series event in November 2016. In December, she finished third to Joshi Helgesson and Matilda Algotsson at the Swedish Championships.

Östlund's first senior international medal, silver, came in February 2017 at the Sofia Trophy in Sofia, Bulgaria, where she finished second to Isadora Williams. At the Nordics Open, held in March in Reykjavík, Iceland, she outscored both of her national co-medalists for the bronze medal and joined former world champions Carolina Kostner and Elizaveta Tuktamysheva on the podium. Later in the same month, she competed at the 2017 World Junior Championships in Taipei, Taiwan. She qualified to the free skate by placing 15th in the short and went on to finish 13th overall.

2017–2018 season: Pyeongchang Olympics 
In September, Sweden qualified a spot at the 2018 Winter Olympics due to Matilda Algotsson's result at the 2017 CS Nebelhorn Trophy.

In December, Östlund won the Swedish senior national title by a 19-point margin over Algotsson. In January, she finished as Sweden's top ladies' entry at the 2018 European Championships, having placed 6th in the short program, 20th in the free skate, and 17th overall. On 23 January 2018, the Swedish Olympic Committee selected Östlund to compete at the Olympics under the committee's "future" criterion. The following month, she competed at the 2018 Winter Olympics in PyeongChang, South Korea. Ranked 28th in the short program, she did not advance to the final segment.

Programs

Competitive highlights 
CS: Challenger Series; JGP: Junior Grand Prix

References

External links 
 

2001 births
Living people
Sportspeople from Odesa
Swedish people of Russian descent
Swedish female single skaters
Figure skaters at the 2018 Winter Olympics
Olympic figure skaters of Sweden
21st-century Swedish women